José Refugio González Cabrera (4 July 1917 – 18 December 1988) was a Mexican equestrian. He competed in two events at the 1964 Summer Olympics.

References

External links
 

1917 births
1988 deaths
Mexican male equestrians
Olympic equestrians of Mexico
Equestrians at the 1964 Summer Olympics
Pan American Games medalists in equestrian
Pan American Games gold medalists for Mexico
Equestrians at the 1955 Pan American Games
Place of birth missing
Medalists at the 1955 Pan American Games
20th-century Mexican people